The sport of Association football in the country of Réunion is run by the Réunionese Football League. The association administers the national football team, as well as the Réunion Premier League.

League system

Football stadiums in Réunion